Eucalyptus gillii, known as the curly mallee, Arkaroola mallee, or silver mallee, is a species of mallee or small tree that is endemic to inland Australia. It has smooth bark, sometimes with rough bark near the base, often only juvenile, usually glaucous leaves in the crown, flower buds in groups of between seven and eleven, pale yellow flowers and barrel-shaped or shortened spherical fruit.

Description
It has smooth white to grey bark, sometimes with rough, flaky bark on the trunk and lower branches. Flowering mainly occurs from July to November and the flowers are pale yellow.

Taxonomy and naming
Eucalyptus gillii was first formally described in 1912 by Joseph Maiden in his book, A Critical Revision of the Genus Eucalyptus from a specimen collected by Walter Gill "80 miles east of Farina to the Flinders Ranges west of Lake Frome, about 400 miles north of Adelaide, at a place called Umberatana." It is named for Walter Gill who collected the type specimen.

Distribution and habitat
Curly mallee mainly occurs in the northern Flinders Ranges, especially between Arkaroola and Nepabunna. It is also found in the Barrier Ranges north of Broken Hill in New South Wales. It grows in open mallee in gullies and undulating hills, sometimes in pure stands.

References

gillii
Myrtales of Australia
Flora of New South Wales
Flora of South Australia
Trees of Australia
Plants described in 1912
Mallees (habit)
Taxa named by Joseph Maiden